The Lancair 360 is a two-seat aircraft marketed in kit form. It is a low-wing monoplane of conventional configuration with retractable tricycle undercarriage. The Lancair Legacy was chosen to replace the Lancair 360 in 1999.

Variants
Lancair 360TC - Carbon Fiber Turbocharged

Specifications (Lancair 360)

References

360
2000s United States civil utility aircraft
Homebuilt aircraft
Single-engined tractor aircraft
Low-wing aircraft